Mimî Michelle Ndiweni (born 31 August 1991), since 2021 credited as Mimî M. Khayisa, is a British-Zimbabwean actress. She is best known for playing Fringilla Vigo in Netflix's The Witcher, Tilly Brockless in the television series Mr Selfridge, and Ester/Jekasai in the stage production of The Convert at The Gate Theatre in London. She has also appeared on film in Catherine Called Birdy, Star Wars: The Rise of Skywalker, Cinderella and The Legend of Tarzan.

She won the Spotlight Prize in 2013 and went on to work for the Royal Shakespeare Company after graduating from Royal Welsh College of Music and Drama. Khayisa was also featured as One to Watch by the Independent in 2013 and was on the Evening Standards Stars of 2015 list after performing in the RSC's Midsummer Mischief Festival.

Early life 
Khayisa grew up in Guildford, Surrey and started acting as a teenager, joining the Yvonne Arnaud Mill Street Studios while she was in secondary school. From there she went on to complete a degree at the Royal Welsh College of Music & Drama in Cardiff.

Family background 
Khayisa was born in England; her father is from Ntabazinduna in Matabeleland, Zimbabwe, and is the eldest son of Chief Kayisa Ndiweni, while her mother was a Zulu from South Africa and was the daughter of Reverend Geoffrey Bizeni Mkhwanazi, the founder of Assemblies of God in South Africa. Her mother died at the age of thirty-seven.

Spotlight Prize 
At age 21, Khayisa (then stylised as Mimi Ndiweni) won the Spotlight Prize – beating out competition from students from 20 top UK drama schools in front of industry experts - with her performance of Jenna Marbles’ How to Avoid Talking to People You Don’t Want to Talk To.

Career

Theatre 

Khayisa has stated that theatre is her first love and was taken on by the Royal Shakespeare Company in 2013 after graduating from Royal Welsh. While in the RSC her most notable roles were in Wendy & Peter Pan as Tiger Lily, King Lear where she played Cordelia, and Hamlet where she played Ophelia.

She left the RSC in 2015 to take on a regular appearance in the television show Mr Selfridge, but has returned to the RSC on a number occasions as a guest. Khayisa toured North America with the Royal Shakespeare Company in 2018, playing the part of Cordelia in King Lear in New York, and Ophelia in Hamlet in Washington DC.

In 2017, Khayisa had her first leading role, playing Jekesai/Ester in Danai Gurira's The Convert at the Gate Theatre in London. The play itself and her part in it received critical acclaim, with four and five star reviews from some of the most respected critics in London.

Film and television 

Khayisa's first appearance in a major film was as the Slipper Lady in Disney's Cinderella in 2015. She then played Eshe in The Legend of Tarzan in 2016, starring alongside Margot Robbie. In 2016, Khayisa played Tilly Brockless in Mr Selfridge for eight episodes of the last season and in May 2017, played the part of Abby in the Doctor Who episode "Oxygen" during its tenth series.

In October 2018, Netflix announced that Khayisa would be playing the part of Fringilla Vigo in The Witcher. She appeared in both Season 1, released in December 2019, and also Season 2, released in December 2021.

In 2022, Khayisa appeared as Lady Berenice Sidebottom in Catherine Called Birdy.

Filmography

Film

Television

Theatre

References

External links
 

Living people
1991 births
21st-century English actresses
Actors from Guildford
Actresses from Surrey
Alumni of the Royal Welsh College of Music & Drama
Black British actresses
English film actresses
English people of South African descent
English people of Zimbabwean descent
English stage actresses
English television actresses
Zulu people